Gambia–Iran relations are the bilateral relations between The Gambia and Iran. Neither country has a resident ambassador.

History
Relations between the Gambia and Iran begun in the 1970s. The government of Dawda Jawara followed a policy of neutrality during the Iran-Iraq War. Relations progressed following Yahya Jammeh's ascension to the Gambian presidency in a coup d'état in 1994, with Iran offering economic assistance to Gambia regarding agriculture and fisheries in 1996.

Mahmoud Ahmadinejad, the President of Iran, was a guest of honor at the 2006 African Union summit in Gambia's capital city, Banjul, and he and Jammeh maintained "close ties". The Gambia has supported Iran's right to develop its nuclear program (see Nuclear program of Iran). On 2 December 2006, Jammeh made an official state visit to Tehran where he met with Ahmadinejad and Ali Khamenei. Upon his return to Banjul, Jammeh held a press conference where he promised the strengthened ties would lead to benefit for the Gambia and technicians from Iran were due to arrive to help with the country's water supply.

Severing of official ties

On 23 November 2010, the Gambia severed diplomatic and economic relations with Iran and ordered the expulsion from the country within 48 hours of all Iranian officials. The announcement of the Ministry of Foreign Affairs of the Gambia included no reason for the decision, but "sources close to the ministry" pointed to the seizure, in October, by Nigerian security forces of an Iranian weapons shipment headed to the Gambia.

Alaeddin Boroujerdi, Chairman of the National Security and Foreign Policy Committee of the Iranian parliament, the Islamic Consultative Assembly, attributed the action to pressure from the United States.

Among the projects which will be ended by the termination of relations will be an agreement, worth US$2 billion (£1.2 billion), whereby Iran would have supplied lorries and commercial vehicles to the Gambia.

See also
 Foreign relations of the Gambia
 Foreign relations of Iran

References